Klaus-Peter Hennig (born 2 May 1947 in Bremen) is a German former discus thrower who competed in the 1968 Summer Olympics and in the 1972 Summer Olympics.

References

1947 births
Living people
West German male discus throwers
Olympic athletes of West Germany
Athletes (track and field) at the 1968 Summer Olympics
Athletes (track and field) at the 1972 Summer Olympics